Philippe Muyters (born 6 December 1961) is a Belgian politician from the Flemish Region and is a member of the New Flemish Alliance (N-VA).

Muyters was born in Antwerp.  From 2000 until 2009 he was the Managing Director of VOKA (Flemish Chamber of Commerce and Industry). In 2009 he joined the Flemish Government, where he is the Flemish Minister for Finance, Budget, Work, Town and Country Planning and Sports. After the general elections of 2010, he was elected as a Senator. Therefore, he resigned as Flemish Minister for one day, to take the oath as Senator and immediately be succeeded to take the oath again as Flemish Minister.

References

External links

 ministerphilippemuyters.be
 philippemuyters.be 

Living people
1961 births
Government ministers of Flanders
New Flemish Alliance politicians
University of Antwerp alumni
21st-century Belgian politicians